Jumurtov is an urban-type settlement of Amudaryo District in Karakalpakstan in Uzbekistan. Its population was 2,574 people in 1989, and 3,500 in 2016.

References

Populated places in Karakalpakstan
Urban-type settlements in Uzbekistan